The 2021–22 Latvian Hockey League season was the 31st season of the Latvian Hockey League, the top level of ice hockey in Latvia. HK Zemgale/JLSS won their first championship.

Teams

Regular season

Results

Play-off bracket

Semi-finals

Finals

Final rankings

External links 
 optibethokejaliga
 Latvian Hockey League on eurohockey.com
 Latvian Hockey League on eliteprospects.com

Latvian Hockey League
Latvian Hockey League seasons
Latvian